Lubbock is an English surname. Notable persons with that surname include:
 Alfred Lubbock (1845–1916), Kent county cricketer
 Basil Lubbock Alfred Basil Lubbock (1876–1944), British Yachtsman and Marine Author, particularly on clipper ships
 Edgar Lubbock (1847–1907), four times FA Cup Finalist who became a banker and Master of the Blankney Hunt
 Eric Lubbock, 4th Baron Avebury (1928–2016), Liberal Democrat member of the British House of Lords
 Francis Lubbock (1815–1905), Governor of Texas during the American Civil War and brother of Thomas
 Sir John Lubbock, 1st Baronet (1744–1816) 
 Sir John Lubbock, 2nd Baronet (1774–1840)
 John William Lubbock, Sir John William Lubbock, 3rd Baronet (1803–1865), English banker, mathematician and astronomer
 Sir John Lubbock, 1st Baron Avebury (1834–1913), an English banker, politician, naturalist and archaeologist (son of Sir John William Lubbock)
 John Lubbock, 2nd Baron Avebury (1858–1929)
 John Lubbock, 3rd Baron Avebury (1915–1971)
 John Lubbock (conductor), British conductor
 Mark Lubbock (1898–1986), British conductor and composer of operetta and light music
 Michael Lubbock (1906–1989), English banker and businessman
 Sir Nevile Lubbock (1839–1914), Kent county cricketer
 Percy Lubbock (1879–1965), English writer
 Richard Lubbock (c. 1759–1808), English physician and chemist
 Stuart Lubbock, who died in suspicious circumstances in 2001
 Thomas Saltus Lubbock (1817–1862), a Confederate Colonel and Texas Ranger for whom the city and county in Texas are named
 William Lubbock (1701–1754), English divine

Fictional
 The Lubbock family, fictional characters in the situation comedy Just the Ten of Us
 Lubbocks are mythical purple insectoid creatures in Diana Wynne Jones's House of Many Ways